Maitlis is a surname. Notable people with the surname include:

 Emily Maitlis (born 1970), BBC journalist and newsreader
 Peter Maitlis (1933–2022), British  chemist